Cornwell Corner is an angular rock bluff, about  high, at the west end of Horney Bluff and the terminus of Merrick Glacier, where the glacial flow is forced east at an acute angle upon entering Byrd Glacier. It was named by the Advisory Committee on Antarctic Names, in association with Byrd Glacier, after Captain Delbert S. Cornwell, U.S. Navy, who was captain of the aircraft carrier USS Philippine Sea in U.S. Navy Operation Highjump, 1946–47, led by Admiral Byrd.

References
 

Geography of Antarctica
Hillary Coast